Inauguration of Dwight D. Eisenhower may refer to: 

First inauguration of Dwight D. Eisenhower, 1953
Second inauguration of Dwight D. Eisenhower, 1957

See also